Gertrude was a sailing ship built in 1843 in Newfoundland, Canada. She was wrecked upon Nine Mile Beach, New South Wales during a gale on 30 September 1864. One life was lost.

References

1853 ships
Ships built in Canada
Shipwrecks of the Hunter Region
Brigs of Australia
Maritime incidents in September 1864
City of Lake Macquarie